Daniel C. Ferguson (born May 5, 1927) is an American businessman and former president and director of Newell Rubbermaid.

Early life and education
Ferguson was born on May 5, 1927, to Leonard C. Ferguson and Mildred F. Ferguson. Following in his fathers footsteps he attended Hamilton College in Clinton, New York after his release from the US Navy in 1946. He graduated in 1948 with a bachelor's degree in Economics and History. During his time there, he served as co-captain of the college basketball team.

Business career

In 1950 after earning an MBA from Stanford University he began his business career with Newell Rubbermaid. Beginning in 1962 the affiliated Newell Companies, including Western Newell, Newell Window Furnishings and Newell Manufacturing were consolidated into a single corporation headquartered in Freeport, Illinois. Ferguson was hired as president that same year and elected as a Director in 1965. He developed a growth-by-acquisition strategy based on his intention to build a strong, multi-product company through "Newellization".

References

1927 births
American businesspeople
Living people
Hamilton College (New York) alumni
Stanford University alumni